Amy York Rubin is an American writer and director. She has directed multiple episodes of television series, including the award-winning pilot of the Netflix series Dead to Me.

Rubin began her career in comedy. She wrote, created and directed the web series Little Horribles (2013). The Huffington Post called the series "the lesbian answer to Girls. The New York Times reviewed the series positively. Little Horribles won for Best Indie Series at the 4th Streamy Awards.

Since then, Amy has served as a director for numerous projects, including the pilot and episodes of Love, Victor, Dietland, Superstore, Angie Tribeca, Casual, I'm Sorry, Fresh Off The Boat, SMILF and more.

Filmography

Film

Television

Web

References

External links 
 

American film directors
American television producers
American women television producers
American web series actresses
American women film directors
American women screenwriters
American lesbian actresses
American lesbian writers
Living people
LGBT film directors
LGBT television directors
American LGBT screenwriters
Vassar College alumni
21st-century American actresses
Year of birth missing (living people)
21st-century American LGBT people
American women television directors
American television directors